Georgios Konsolas (born 17 November 1990) is a Greek lightweight rower. He won a gold medal at the 2013 World Rowing Championships in Chungju with the lightweight men's quadruple scull.

References

1990 births
Living people
Greek male rowers
World Rowing Championships medalists for Greece